Tse (Ц ц; italics: Ц ц), also known as Ce, is a letter of the Cyrillic script.

It commonly represents the voiceless alveolar affricate , similar but not identical to the pronunciation of zz in "pizza" or ts in cats.

In the standard Iron dialect of Ossetic, it represents the voiceless alveolar sibilant fricative /s/. In other dialects, including Digoron, it has the same value as in Russian.

However, in proper names (personal names, toponyms, etc.) and titles it may also be rendered as c (which signifies the sound in Serbo-Croatian, Czech, Polish, Hungarian etc.), z (which signifies the sound in Italian and German), cz or tz. Its equivalent in the modern Romanian Latin alphabet is ț.

History
Tse is thought to have come from the Hebrew letter Ṣade ⟨⟩, via the Glagolitic letter Tsi (Ⱌ ⱌ).

New Church Slavonic and Russian (archaic name) spelling of the name is цы. In modern Russian, Ukrainian, and Belarusian, the name of the letter is pronounced [tsɛ] and spelled це (sometimes цэ) in Russian, це in Ukrainian, and цэ in Belarusian.

In the Cyrillic numeral system, Tse has a value of 900.

Usage

Russian
It is the 24th (if Yo is included) letter of the Russian alphabet. It is used both in native Slavic words (and corresponds to Proto-Indo-European *k in certain positions) and in borrowed words:
 as a match for the Latin  in words of Latin origin, such as цирк (circus), центр (centre),
  may correspond to Latin  (before vowels), such as сцинтилляция (scintillation).

 the ending - of the plural number or the genitive case (птица nominative singular → птицы nominative plural or genitive singular),
 possessive suffix - is spelled - after  and only then: троицын, курицын,
 the suffix is very popular in Russian last names, but spelling varies and both - and - are possible, Ельцин is an example,
 the ending of adjectives - (that becomes -, -, -, - in declension) such as куцый or бледнолицый,
 conjugation of a vulgar verb сцать (сцы, сцым, сцыт, сцыте, сцышь) and its prefixed derivatives,
 a few other word roots: цыган, цык- (цыкать, цыкнуть), цып- (цыплёнок, цыпки, цыпочки, цып-цып), цыц,
 pre-1956 lists contain words such as цыбик, цыбуля, цыгарка, цыдулка, цыкля, цымбалы, цымес, цынга, цыновка, цынубель, цырюльня, цытварный, цыфирь, панцырь, etc. (examples taken from Ya. S. Khomutov's spelling dictionary, 1927 but now all those words are spelled with -ци-),
 Pinyin's  becomes , and  becomes .

Related letters and other similar characters
צ : Hebrew letter Tsadi
C c : Latin letter C
С с : Cyrillic letter С
Ț ț : Latin letter T with comma below, used in Romanian to represent the [ts] sound
Ţ ţ : Latin letter T with cedilla, used in Gagauz to represent that very sound
Ŧ ŧ : Latin letter T with stroke
Ts ts ʦ: Digraph Ts
Z z: Latin letter Z - same sound in German

Computing codes

External links

References